Daniel Christopher Newman (born 12 May 1976) is a British actor. He has appeared in more than forty films since 1985.

Selected filmography

Awards
 Best Young Actor Co-Starring in a Motion Picture (1991)

References

External links
 

1976 births
Living people
Male actors from York
British male film actors
British male television actors